Uncial 0171 (in the Gregory-Aland numbering), ε 07 (Soden) are two vellum leaves of a late third century (or beginning of the fourth) Greek uncial Bible codex containing fragments of the Gospel of Matthew and the Gospel of Luke. Luke fragment, in two parts, is preserved in the Laurentian Library collection in Florence (PSI 1.2 + PSI 2.124), and the Matthew fragment is in the Berlin State Museum (P. 11863).

Description 

Uncial 0171 measures 5.7 cm by 9.2 cm from a page of two columns of 23 lines. The scribe wrote in a reformed documentary hand. It has errors of itacism, the nomina sacra are contracted (ΚΣ, ΙΗΣ). ανθρωπος is uncontracted. Luke 22:51 and 22:62 are omitted.

The Alands describe the text as "an early (secondary?) form of the D [Codex Bezae] text" and "paraphrastic". Uncial 0171 is an important witness to the existence of the Western text-type in Egypt. Aland placed it in Category IV. It is the earliest Greek witness with text of Luke 22:43–44.

It is classed as a "consistently cited witness of the first order" in Nestle-Aland's Novum Testamentum Graece. Its 27th edition (NA27) considers it even more highly than other witnesses of this type. It provides an exclamation mark (!) for "papyri and uncial manuscripts of particular significance because of their age."

The manuscript was found in 1903–1905 in Hermopolis Magna. The text was first published by the Società Italiana in Florence in 1912. Hermann von Soden knew the first fragment only in time to include it in the list of addenda in 1913. He classified it within his Ια text. Marie-Joseph Lagrange gave a collation, he classifies the fragment in his "recension D", and argues that the divergences of the fragment from the Codex Bezae are due to idiosyncrasies either of that manuscript or of the fragment itself. Kurt Treu identified the Matthew and Luke portions as the work of the same scribe on the same codex. Later again, Neville Birdsall observed that a lower portion of the manuscript had been overlooked in the editio princeps.

Text 
Fragment (a) + (b): Recto (Luke 22:44-50)

Fragment (a) + (b): Verso (Luke 22:50-56.61-64)

Fragment (c): Recto (hair side) (Matthew 10:17-23)

Fragment (c): Verso (flesh side) (Matthew 10:25-32)

See also 
 Other early uncials
 Uncial 0162
 Uncial 0189
 Uncial 0220
 Uncial 0308
 Related articles
 List of New Testament uncials
 Textual criticism

References

Further reading 

 Ermenegildo Pistelli, Papiri greci e latini della Società Italiana (Florence, 1912), 1:2-4; 2:22-25.
 Kurt Aland, Alter und Entstehung des D-Textes im Neuen Testament. Betrachtungen zu 𝔓 69 und 0171, Miscellània\Papirològica Ramon Roca-Puig (Barcelona 1987), pp. 37–61.
 James Neville Birdsall, A Fresh Examination of the Fragments of the Gospel of St. Luke in MS. 0171 and an Attempted Reconstruction with Special Reference to the Recto, in: Collected papers in Greek and Georgian Textual Criticism, Texts and Studies, Gorgias Press 2006, Vol. 3, pp. 15–138.

External links 

 Biblioteca Medicea Laurenziana
 Books of the New Testament on Parchment in Codex Form
 

Greek New Testament uncials
4th-century biblical manuscripts
Early Greek manuscripts of the New Testament
3rd-century biblical manuscripts